Taynaq (also, Taynag and Taynakh) is a village and municipality in the Aghjabadi Rayon of Azerbaijan.  It has a population of 810.

References 

Populated places in Aghjabadi District